Søre Ål Church is a parish church of the Church of Norway in Lillehammer Municipality in Innlandet county, Norway. It is located in the south part of the town of Lillehammer. It is the church for the Søre Ål parish which is part of the Sør-Gudbrandsdal prosti (deanery) in the Diocese of Hamar. The gray, concrete church was built in a rectangular design in 1964 using plans drawn up by the architect Bjarne Bystad Ellefsen. The church seats about 200 people.

History

In the mid-20th century, the parish decided to build a cemetery at Søre Ål. The new cemetery was consecrated in 1953. Soon after, the parish decided to build a church at the cemetery site. Bjarne Bystad Ellefsen was hired to design the new church. It was built out of concrete and wood and it was completed in 1964. The altarpiece by Victor Sparre shows a thorn-crowned Christ head with a cross in the background. There is also a glass frieze, showing the eyes of God, along the altar wall.

Søre Ål parish
Gårdsnummer 59-98 were included in this parish. The attached KML file shows the church location and the farm locations in Gnr/Bnr format.

See also
List of churches in Hamar

References

External links
 Kirkesok Søre Ål kirke
 Kulturminnesøk Søre Ål kirkested

Buildings and structures in Lillehammer
Churches in Innlandet
Churches in Sør-Gudbrandsdal Deanery
Rectangular churches in Norway
Concrete churches in Norway
20th-century Church of Norway church buildings
Churches completed in 1964
1964 establishments in Norway